Éric Bellot des Minières (born 5 April 1964 in Poitiers) is an army general of the French Army. He has been Inspector General of the French Armed Forces since October 31, 2020.

Biography

Famille 
Éric Bellot des Minières is a member of an old French noble family.

Education 
Bellot des Minières attended École spéciale militaire de Saint-Cyr from 1984 to 1987. He then attended ENSTA ParisTech graduating in 1999 with an Engineering diploma, and a specialisation in operational research.

Positions held 
In 1988, he joined the 2nd Foreign Parachute Regiment in Calvi, where he served until 1995, after commanding the 3rd company. It was during this first stint at the 2nd REP that he took part in Operation Épervier (1988-1989) and Guépard (1990) in Chad, Operation Noroît (1991-1992) in Rwanda, Operation Godoria (1991) and Operation Iskoutir (1992 and 1993) in Djibouti, Somalia (1992-1993), and the EFAO (1995) in the Central African Republic. From 1995 to 1996, he was at the Staff School in Compiègne, before becoming an instructor and head of the "Tactical and Weapons Employment" course at the School of Transmission Application in Laval. After studying at ENSTA Paris (1997-199) then at the École de guerre (1999-2000), he returned to the 2nd REP in Calvi, where he took up the position of head of the operations and instruction office (BOI) from 2000 to 2002. During this period, he took part in operation Trident in Kosovo, from 2000 to 2001. From 2002 to 2006, he served at the General Staff of the Army as a "dismounted combat" synthesis officer to the Weapons System Office. From 2006 to 2008, he was assigned to the office of the Minister of Defence, first as deputy to the army/national theater-DOM-TOM cell, then deputy to the preparation for the future cell.

From 2008 to 2010, he was commanding officer of the 2nd REP in Calvi. During this period, he commanded the Battle Group Altor engaged from January 13 to July 14, 2010, as part of Brigade La Fayette in Afghanistan. During this operation his regiment is cited in the order of the army of the Cross for Military Valour. From 2010 to 2011, he was an auditor at the Center for Advanced Military Studies (CHEM) and at the Institute for Advanced National Defense Studies (IHEDN). From 2011 to 2014, he was assigned to the EMA as an operational coherence officer (OCO). The decree of June 4, 2014 appointed him commander of the 1st mechanized brigade from August 1, 2014. From June 17, 2014, to March 29, 2015, he commanded Operation Sangaris in the Central African Republic, where he relieved General Francisco Soriano. From August 1, 2015, to July 31, 2017, he commanded the 11th Parachute Brigade. He was appointed honorary corporal of the navy troops at the national gathering in Bazeilles on August 31, 2016. By decree of January 24, 2018, he was appointed Deputy Chief of Staff Plans of the General Staff armies. He was then appointed Chief of Staff Plans on September 1, 2018.

Since October 31, 2020, he has been Inspector General of the Armed Forces.

Military Facts 

In 2010, he evokes the war in Afghanistan: “The first duty of the legionnaire is to fulfill the mission. […] The mission was a success. […] The human toll is three killed and 19 injured, including 12 by fire. […] We honor their death more than we mourn it. This is the Legionnaire's Code. »15. His superior, General Maurin describes him as a “man of contacts and friendships” and on the subject of the campaign in Afghanistan says of him: “The results are particularly glowing. Colonel Bellot des Minières showed a perfect understanding of the stakes of a war against the insurgency. He clearly imposed his operational mark on the regiment. »

Publications 
"Physical strength in the service of victory", in revue Inflexions, 2012/1 (n°19), p. 45-51

Grades et Distinctions

Grades 
Colonel, he was appointed on June 4, 2014, to the rank of general of brigade, on August 1, 2017, to the rank of general of division. On July 11, 2018, he was elevated to the rank and designation of Army Corps General and on October 21, 2020, appointed Inspector General of the Armed Forces and elevated to the rank and designation of Army General from the following October 31.

Distinctions 

Éric Bellot des Minières was named Commander in the National Order of the Legion of Honor, and Officer in the Ordre national du Mérite.

He holds the following decorations:

 Croix de la Valeur militaire
 Croix du combattant
 Médaille d'Outre-Mer
 Médaille de la Défense nationale (médaille d'or)
 Médaille d’honneur pour acte de courage et de dévouement (médaille d'or)
 Médaille de Reconnaissance de la Nation (d'Afrique du Nord)
 Médaille commémorative française
 Médaille de la protection militaire du territoire
 Médaille de l'OTAN pour le Kosovo
 Médaille de l'OTAN Non-Article 5 pour l'ISAF (Afghanistan)
 US Army Commendation Medal
 Médaille du service de la Politique européenne de sécurité et de défense, EUFOR RCA
 Commandeur de l'ordre de la reconnaissance centrafricaine
 Croix de la Valeur Militaire Centrafricaine

References

1964 births
Living people
French generals
Officers of the French Foreign Legion
Recipients of the Legion of Honour